Wiley Roy Mason (November 9, 1878 - December 25, 1967) was a bishop of The Episcopal Church, serving in the Diocese of Virginia as suffragan from 1942 to 1951.

Early life and education
Mason was born on November 9, 1878, in King George, Virginia, the son of Julian J. Mason and Elizabeth Freeland. He studied at the College of William & Mary from where he graduated in 1904. He was also educated at the Virginia Theological Seminary from where he graduated in 1907.

Ordained Ministry
Mason was ordained deacon in 1907 and priest on May 24, 1908, by Bishop Robert Atkinson Gibson, the latter in the Immanuel Chapel of the Virginia Theological Seminary. He was appointed in charge of the Mission Home District of the Archdeaconry of Blue Ridge, a post he retained till 1918. In 1918 he became rector of Christ Church in Charlottesville, Virginia, while in 1926 he became Archdeacon of the Blue Ridge.

Bishop
Mason was elected Suffragan Bishop of Virginia in May 1942, during the 147th diocesan council meeting which took place between the 26 and 28 of May. He was consecrated on September 22, 1942, by Presiding Bishop Henry St. George Tucker, in Christ Church, Charlottesville, Virginia. He retained the post till his retirement in 1951, however, he remained Assistant Bishop of Virginia till his death. He died after a prolonged illness on Christmas Day, 1967.

References

Virginia Theological Seminary alumni
College of William & Mary alumni
People from King George County, Virginia
1878 births
1967 deaths
Episcopal bishops of Virginia